Israel E. Iwekanuno was a Nigerian writer and historian. He is chiefly known as the writer of Akuko Ala Obosi, the first Igbo language historical book which was published in 1923.

References 

Nigerian writers
20th-century Nigerian historians